Patrice O'Neill is an Australian water polo player. She was a member of the side that won the gold medal at the 2006 FINA Women's Water Polo World Cup.

References

Australian female water polo players
Year of birth missing (living people)
Living people
21st-century Australian women